Triller is an American video-sharing social networking service. The service allows users to create and share short-form videos, including videos set to, or automatically synchronized to music using artificial intelligence technology. Triller was released for iOS and Android in 2015, and initially operated as a video editing app before adding social networking features.

In mid-2020, the app gained prominence in India and the United States as a competitor to the similar Chinese-owned app TikTok, after the service was banned in India, and faced the threat of a ban in the U.S. Triller later expanded into sports promotion, distributing pay-per-view boxing events between Mike Tyson and Roy Jones Jr. and Jake Paul and Ben Askren, both incorporating appearances by internet, sports, music, and entertainment personalities.

History
Triller was launched in 2015 by co-founders David Leiberman and Sammy Rubin. The app was originally positioned as a video editor, using artificial intelligence to automatically edit distinct clips into music videos. They later launched Triller Famous, a page within the app that featured curated selections of user videos. In 2016, the app was converted into a social networking service by allowing users to follow each other and share their videos publicly. In 2019, Ryan Kavanaugh's Proxima Media made a majority investment. It is headquartered in Los Angeles, California, and is currently led by CEO Mahi de Silva.

On June 29, 2020, Government of India banned TikTok, among other apps stating that they were "prejudicial to [the] sovereignty and integrity" of India. Triller, which had planned to enter into the Indian market by the end of 2020, saw a spike from less than 1 million users to over 30 million users in the country overnight.  In July 2020, Triller sued ByteDance,  the Chinese parent company of TikTok, for infringing patents relating to video editing.

In August 2020, U.S. president Donald Trump signed an executive order which threatened to ban TikTok from operating within the United States, citing threats to national security, unless it was sold by ByteDance. The Trump administration stated that TikTok had until November 12, 2020, to assure the administration that the app did not pose any national security threats to the U.S. Following this order and news of possible purchases of TikTok's American operations by companies such as Oracle, Triller jumped from number 198 to number one in the App Store in the U.S., while TikTok dropped down to number three. The discussions surrounding TikTok's potential ban in the United States caused popular TikTok stars, including Charli D’Amelio and her family, to join Triller. Trump joined Triller himself and posted his first video on August 15, 2020. The video received over a million views within hours.

In August 2020, Triller partnered with B2B music company 7digital, which will provide Triller with access to its catalogue of 80 million tracks and automatically report usage data to Sony Music, Warner Music Group, Universal Music Group and Merlin Network. On October 2, 2020, Triller signed licensing deals with the rights societies PRS for Music, GEMA, STIM and IMRO, and the publishers Concord, Downtown and Peermusic.

On February 5, 2021, Universal Music Group removed its catalogue from Triller, citing unpaid music royalties. On March 24, 2021, Triller signed a licensing agreement with the National Music Publishers' Association.

Features
The Triller app allows users to create music videos, skits, and lip-sync videos containing background music. The app's spotlight feature is its special auto-editing tool, which uses artificial intelligence to automatically stitch separate video clips together without the user having to do it themselves. The separate video clips are created to the same background music, but users are able to shoot multiple takes with different filters or edits each time. Once the auto-editing tool stitches the individual clips together, users can rearrange and replace clips as desired. Users can also customize videos by applying filters and text.

When creating a video, users can choose to make a "music video" or a "social video". A "music video" allows users to add music and trim the audio to personal preference. Unlike the music video option, a "social video" does not require the user to add music in the background. The app's auto-editing tool is only used when making music videos, as it uses the background track to help arrange and synchronize the clips. Users can also link their accounts with Apple Music or Spotify to integrate their playlists.

Incomplete videos that are yet to be shared appear in a user's "Projects" folder. Once finalized, a video can be shared with other users of the app or through social media platforms such as  Facebook, Instagram, Twitter, WhatsApp, and YouTube. Any video on Triller can also be downloaded or shared through links, text messages, or direct messaging to other users within the app.

The app is divided into three video feeds, consisting of videos from creators that the user follows, the "Social" feed (which showcases trending videos and those by verified users), and the "Music" feed (which exclusively features music videos).

Triller accounts can be made either public or private. When the account is public, any user can view the videos on that account. When the account is private, only approved users can view the videos on that account. Users with private accounts can change the privacy settings of individual videos on their accounts from private to public, making the selected videos viewable to anyone on the app. In accordance with online child privacy laws in the United States, children under the age of 13 must receive parental consent in order to create an account on Triller.

User characteristics and behavior 
In August 2020, Triller reported that it had been downloaded over 250 million times worldwide. Mobile analytics firm Apptopia disputed the numbers and claimed they were inflated, suggesting that the app had only been downloaded 52 million times since it first launched in 2015. Apptopia pulled the report after Triller threatened to sue the company.

The app has been downloaded 23.8 million times in the U.S., with users spending an average of more than 20 minutes per day. A large number of downloads come from India, where TikTok has been banned, as well as from various European and African countries.

In October 2020, Triller CEO Mike Lu stated that the app has 100 million monthly active users (MAU). In February 2021, Billboard reported that Triller had "reported higher numbers of monthly active users to the public than it reports to [music] rights holders." CEO Lu argued that "there is no legal definition" of monthly and daily active users, and that "if someone is trying to compare TikTok's MAU/DAU to ours—which means they are saying we have the same definition of MAU/DAU—there is an inherent misunderstanding about Triller's business and business model. It’s like trying to compare a fish and a bicycle." In a public statement, Lu denied that the company had inflated its user metrics.

Triller has attracted celebrity users like Chance the Rapper, Justin Bieber, Marshmello, The Weeknd, Alicia Keys, Cardi B, Eminem, Post Malone and Kevin Hart. The app is also used by TikTok stars such as Charli D’Amelio, Josh Richards, Noah Beck, Griffin Johnson, and Dixie D’Amelio. Triller has offered large sums of money, company equity, and advisory roles to encourage prominent TikTok users to move to Triller, such as The Sway Boys. Sway House member Josh Richards became the Chief Strategy Officer of Triller after concerns regarding user data motivated him to find a "safe place" for himself and his followers.

Events
In April 2020, amid the COVID-19 pandemic, Triller organized a three-day streaming music festival known as "Trillerfest" in support of No Kid Hungry and the MusiCares COVID-19 Relief Fund. The event was headlined by Don Diablo, Marshmello, Migos, Pitbull, Snoop Dogg, and Wyclef Jean.

Boxing
In July 2020, Triller announced that it had partnered with Mike Tyson's Legends Only League to become the media partner for its boxing events, with its inaugural event being an exhibition fight between Tyson and Roy Jones Jr. on November 28, 2020, distributed via pay-per-view. Triller would handle distribution of the fight to pay-per-view platforms and services such as Fite TV, and also carry a documentary miniseries leading into the fight. The PPV would not be carried within the Triller app itself due to its focus on short-form video, and a goal for wider distribution via traditional PPV outlets. Following the event, it was reported that the PPV had at least 1.6 million buys, surpassing UFC 251 as the most-bought combat sports PPV of 2020.

Ryan Kavanaugh, CEO of parent company Proxima Media, described the fight as being the launch of Triller's "high-end live events business", and explained that they aimed to reach audiences beyond core boxing fans by leveraging the present "cultural zeitgeist"; the PPV included a co-main event between internet celebrity Jake Paul and former NBA player Nate Robinson, music performances by acts such as Wiz Khalifa, and featured Snoop Dogg as a commentator. Kavanaugh later referred to this practice as a "four-quadrant" entertainment event, supplementing boxing with internet, music, and sports personalities.

In December 2020, Triller announced a partnership with Snoop Dogg to form Triller Fight Club—a "boxing league" that would be produced and hosted by Snoop Dogg, and consist of a series of annual PPV cards with  "four-quadrant" elements carried over from the Tyson/Jones event. The first event under the banner was held on April 17, 2021, with a main event between Jake Paul and Ben Askren, and performances by The Black Keys, Diplo, Doja Cat, Justin Bieber, Major Lazer, Saweetie, and Mt. Westmore —a supergroup featuring Snoop, Ice Cube, Too Short and E-40. The event was held behind closed doors at Mercedes-Benz Stadium in Atlanta, with Triller intentionally limiting attendance to 100 spectators chosen via promotional contests on the Triller app; Kavanaugh described this as a "golden ticket" model supporting its goal to give home viewers a "front row" experience.

In February 2021, it was reported that Triller Fight Club had won a purse bid to promote the fight between Teófimo López and George Kambosos to defend López's unified lightweight titles, beating out Matchroom and Top Rank with a bid reported to be $6 million. Kavanaugh stated that the match would likely be a co-main event on a future card. In March 2021, Oscar De La Hoya announced a comeback fight during a planned card on July 3. In May 2021, Triller signed long-time HBO boxing personality Jim Lampley as its lead commentator; his role was expected to begin with Teófimo López vs. George Kambosos Jr. on June 19. However, after the López vs. Kambosos fight was postponed on multiple occasions, the International Boxing Federation ruled that Triller was in breach of their contractual obligation to stage the fight, subsequently awarding the rights to Matchroom as the second highest bidders.

Basketball
In June 2021, Triller partnered with Big3 to serve as a digital media partner for the league. This will include 30 hours of live games streaming within the Triller app (including exclusive coverage of the Big3 All-Star Game), coverage of the Big3 draft, social media presences, and courtside advertising.

Controversies
In September 2020, Triller claimed to serve 100 million active monthly users, but this number was quickly disputed by six former employees interviewed by Business Insider. Within a few weeks of Triller's claim, employees shared screenshots of the company's internal analytics that showed less than 2.5 million active monthly users. The number of Triller's app installations came under scrutiny around the same time. Third-party analytics firm Apptopia estimated only 52 million lifetime installations of the app by August 2020 while Triller claimed 250 million. Triller threatened to sue Apptopia for publishing the report.

In February 2021, Universal Music Group (UMG) pulled all of its music from Triller's app because Triller "shamefully withheld payments owed to our artists" and refused to negotiate future music licensing. Triller responded with the assertion that "relevant artists" were already partnered with Triller, so a deal with UMG was unnecessary. The two companies reached an expanded licensing agreement in May 2021.

In November 2021, Triller owner Ryan Kavanaugh publicized Triller Fight Club's new Triller Triad Combat with an open invitation to UFC president Dana White. The invitation, wreathed in a floral border, personally invited White to the event and offered an arranged tour and personalized autograph. Kavanaugh's targeted appeal to Dana White may have been connected with White's comments on Triller in May 2021 when he dismissed questions about Triller saying, "You think I care what Triller thinks? I don't even take their calls. This idiot calls me every day. He calls me every day: 'Please answer my call. Please talk to me. Why won't you talk to me?' Because I don't give a f*ck about you."

Lawsuits
In response to Triller's July 2020 patent suit against TikTok, TikTok and its parent company ByteDance filed a lawsuit against Triller, alleging the litigation initiated by Triller has "cast a cloud" over TikTok's reputation and business dealings.

Triller has filed lawsuits against several websites and a 19-year-old alleging illegal distribution of its streamed April 2021 boxing event, seeking $100 million and $150,000 respectively in damages. Following the dismissal of the $100 million suit as a misjoinder, Triller's subsidiary Triller Fight Club filed an amended complaint against H3 Podcast, a video podcast native to YouTube, seeking $50 million in damages. The podcast's host Ethan Klein claims his inclusion of a 45-second clip of the event in one of his broadcasts constitutes fair use and alleges that Ryan Kavanaugh, a major stakeholder, has instigated the lawsuit "out of spite".

In November 2021, Triller was sued for infringing a design patent and registered copyright and trademark in the marketing of Triller Fight Club's Triad Combat.

On 16 August 2022, Swizz Beatz and Timbaland sued Triller, alleging that they are owed over $28 million related to the purchase of the webcast series Verzuz. Triller had bought Verzuz in January 2021 for an undisclosed sum.

See also 
List of social networking services
Timeline of social media
Chingari
Likee

References

External links
 Official site  (in English)

2015 software
Internet culture
Internet properties established in 2015
IOS software
Mobile applications
Mobile social software
Music software
Social networking services
Video hosting
Video software